Parliaments and legislative bodies around the world impose certain rules and standards during debates. Tradition has evolved that there are words or phrases that are deemed inappropriate for use in the  legislature whilst it is in session. 
In a Westminster system, this is called unparliamentary language and there are similar rules in other kinds of legislative systems. This includes, but is not limited to, the suggestion of dishonesty or the use of profanity. Most unacceptable is any insinuation that another member is dishonourable. So, for example, in the British House of Commons any direct reference to a member as lying is unacceptable. A conventional alternative, when necessary, is to complain of a "terminological inexactitude".

Exactly what constitutes unparliamentary language is generally left to the discretion of the Speaker of the House. Part of the speaker's job is to enforce the assembly's debating rules, one of which is that members may not use "unparliamentary" language. That is, their words must not offend the dignity of the assembly. In addition, legislators in some places are protected from prosecution and civil actions by parliamentary immunity which generally stipulates that they cannot be sued or otherwise prosecuted for anything spoken in the legislature. Consequently, they are expected to avoid using words or phrases that might be seen as abusing that immunity.

Like other rules that have changed with the times, speakers' rulings on unparliamentary language reflect the tastes of the period. The Table, the annual journal of the Society of Clerks-at-the-Table in Commonwealth Parliaments, includes a list of expressions ruled unparliamentary that year in the national and regional assemblies of its members.

Partial list, by country

Australia
In the Australian Senate, the words "liar" and "dumbo" were ordered to be withdrawn and deemed unparliamentary during a session in 1997.

Belgium
In Belgium, there is no such thing as unparliamentary language. A member of parliament is allowed to say anything they wish when inside parliament. This is considered necessary in Belgium to be able to speak of a democratic state and is a constitutional right. Nevertheless, when on 27 March 2014, Laurent Louis called the Prime Minister Elio Di Rupo a pedophile, the other members of parliament left the room in protest. This immunity that manifests itself in an absolute freedom of speech when in parliament does not exist when outside of parliament. In that case, prosecution is possible when and if the majority of parliament decides so.

Canada
These are some of the words and phrases that speakers through the years have ruled "unparliamentary" in the Parliament of Canada, the Legislative Assembly of Alberta, the Legislative Assembly of Manitoba, the National Assembly of Québec, and the Legislative Assembly of Ontario:

 Parliamentary pugilist (1875) 
 a bag of wind (1878)
 inspired by forty-rod whisky (1881)
 coming into the world by accident (1886)
 blatherskite (1890)
 the political sewer pipe from Carleton County (1917)
 lacking in intelligence (1934)
 a dim-witted saboteur (1956)
 liar (1959, 2022)
 devoid of honour (1960)
 joker in the house (1960)
 ignoramus (1961)
 scurrilous (1961)
 to hell with Parliament attitude (1961)
 trained seal (1961)
 evil genius (1962)
 demagogue (1963)
 Canadian Mussolini (1964)
 sick animal (1966)
 pompous ass (1967)
 crook (1971)
 does not have a spine (1971)
 fuddle duddle (1971)
 pig (1977)
 jerk (1980)
 sleazebag (1984)
 racist (1986, 1997 and 2020)
 absolute fraud (1986)
 lying scum (1987)
 scuzzball (1988)
 traitor (1992)
 son of a bitch (1997)
 modern‑day Klansmen (2002)
 weathervane (2007)
 Il Duce (2007)
 a piece of shit (2011)
 he doesn't give a fuck (2018)
 crap (2021)

Hong Kong

The President of the Legislative Council ordered out for using the following phrases:
  ("foul grass grows out of a foul ditch"), when referring to some of the members (1996).

The following phrases have been deemed unparliamentary by the President of the Legislative Council:
 (literally "stumble on street", loosely translated as "go die" or "go to hell") widely considered by Hong Kongers as unacceptable language in civil settings (2009).

India
In 2012, the Indian Parliament published a book of words and phrases that were considered to be unparliamentary:

Ali Baba and the Forty Thieves, bad man, badmashi, bandicoot, blackmail, blind, deaf and dumb, bluffing, bribe, bucket of shit, communist, confused mind, dacoit, darling (said to a female MP), deceive, double-minded, double-talk, downtrodden, goonda, lazy, liar, loudmouth, lousy, nuisance, racketeer, radical extremist, rat, ringmaster, scumbag, thief, thumbprint (to an illiterate MP)In July 2022, the Lok Sabha Secretariat came up with a booklet of unparliamentary words with an additional list of the following:abused, ahankaar, anarchist, apmaan, asatya, ashamed, baal buddhi, bechara, behri sarkar, betrayed, bloodshed, bloody, bobcut, chamcha, chamchagiri, cheated, chelas, childishness, corrupt, Covid spreader, coward, criminal, crocodile tears, daadagiri, dalal, danga, dhindora peetna, dictatorial, disgrace, dohra charitra, donkey, drama, eyewash, foolish, fudge, gaddar, ghadiyali ansu, girgit, goons, hooliganism, hypocrisy, incompetent, Jaichand, jumlajeevi, kala bazaari, kala din, Khalistani, khareed farokht, khoon se kheti, lie, lollypop, mislead, nautanki, nikamma, pitthu, samvedanheen, sexual harassment, Shakuni, Snoopgate, taanashah, taanashahi, untrue, vinash purush, vishwasghat.

Ireland
In Dáil Éireann, the lower house of the Oireachtas (Irish parliament), the chair (Ceann Comhairle or replacement) rules in accordance with standing orders on disorderly conduct, including prohibited words, expressions, and insinuations. If the chair rules that an utterance is out of order, then typically the member withdraws the remark and no further action occurs. The relevant words are retained in the Official Report transcription despite being formally withdrawn. The chair cannot rule if they did not hear the words alleged to be unparliamentary. A member who refuses to withdraw a remark may be suspended and must leave the chamber. A periodically updated document, Salient Rulings of the Chair, lists past rulings,
ordered by topic, with reference to the Official Report. Rulings superseded by subsequent changes to standing orders are omitted. It is disorderly for one Teachta Dála (TD; deputy) to "call another Deputy names", specifically including:

brat, buffoon, chancer, communist, corner boy, coward, fascist, gurrier, guttersnipe, hypocrite, rat, scumbag, scurrilous speaker, or yahoo; 

or to insinuate that a TD is lying or drunk. The word "handbagging" is unparliamentary "particularly with reference to a lady member of the House". Allegations of criminal or dishonourable conduct against a member can only be made by a formal motion. Conduct specifically ruled on includes selling one's vote, violation of cabinet confidentiality, and doctoring the Official Report. Charges against a member's political party are allowed; the chair decides whether an allegation is "personal" or "political". Members may not refer to the Dáil or its proceedings as a:

circus, farce, slander machine.

During a December 2009 debate, Paul Gogarty said, "With all due respect, in the most unparliamentary language, fuck you Deputy [Emmet] Stagg." He immediately apologised and withdrew the remark. The debate's temporary chairman at the time lacked the Ceann Comhairle's power to suspend disorderly members; in any case, once Gogarty withdrew the remark he was not out of order, although his words led to general disorder in the chamber. Gogarty's apology noted ("rather tenuously") that the word fuck was not explicitly listed in the Salient Rulings.  Ensuing calls for tougher sanctions led the Dáil Committee on Procedure and Privileges (CPP) to refer the matter to a subcommittee, which said the correct response was for the CPP to issue a formal rebuke, as had in fact been done to Gogarty.

After heated interruptions to a November 2012 debate, Ceann Comhairle Seán Barrett said "This is not a shouting match, like gurriers on a street shouting at each other." A spokesperson said gurriers was not out of order since it was not addressed at an individual.

Italy
In Italian history, the unparliamentarian language was the only limit to free speech of a deputy. So it was claimed by Giacomo Matteotti in his last discourse in the Chamber of Deputies:

In addition, during the Republic, the use of foul language in Parliament produced jurisprudence by the constitutional court, which has implemented the libel suits.

New Zealand
The Parliament of New Zealand maintains a list of words, and particularly phrases, that the Speaker has ruled are unbecoming, insulting, or otherwise unparliamentary. These include:
 Members hated the sight of khaki (1943)
 I would cut the honourable gentleman's throat if I had the chance (1946)
 idle vapourings of a mind diseased (1946)
 his brains could revolve inside a peanut shell for a thousand years without touching the sides (1949)
 energy of a tired snail returning home from a funeral (1963)
 Intestinal fortitude (1974)
 Racist (1977)

The Parliament also maintains a list of language that has been uttered in the House, and has been found not to be unparliamentary; this includes:
 commo (meaning communist, 1969)
 scuttles for his political funk hole (1974)

Norway
In 2009, a member of the Progress Party was interrupted during question period by the Speaker for calling a minister a "highway bandit".

United Kingdom
In the House of Commons of the United Kingdom, the following words have been deemed unparliamentary over time: bastard, blackguard, coward, deceptive, dodgy, drunk, falsehoods, git, guttersnipe, hooligan, hypocrite, idiot, ignoramus, liar, misled, pipsqueak, rat, slimy, sod, squirt, stoolpigeon, swine, tart, traitor, and wart.

In addition, accusations of 'crooked deals' or insinuation of the use of banned substances by a member are considered unparliamentary language (all attributable to Dennis Skinner). An accusation that an MP's presence in the house has "been bought" is also unparliamentary.

The word 'dodgy' when used by Ed Miliband, was not however, found to be unparliamentary.

In 2019, in the run up to the Conservative leadership election, SNP leader Ian Blackford accused Boris Johnson of being a racist. Asked to withdraw the term by the speaker, Blackford confirmed that he had informed Johnson about his intention to use it and qualified his statement. The speaker then allowed it to stand. In the following week he accused Johnson of being a liar ("has made a career out of lying"). No request was made by the speaker to withdraw this statement.

In 2021, Labour MP Dawn Butler was ejected from the Commons for accusing Boris Johnson of lying repeatedly to the House. When asked by the deputy speaker to "reflect on her words" after the first statement, Butler replied "It's funny that we get in trouble in this place for calling out the lie, rather than the person lying" whereupon she was ordered to withdraw from the House.

Northern Ireland
The Speaker of the Northern Ireland Assembly, William Hay, gave a ruling in the chamber on 24 November 2009 on unparliamentary language. In essence rather than making judgements on the basis of particular words or phrases that have been ruled to be unparliamentary in the Assembly or elsewhere the Speaker said that he would judge members' remarks against standards of courtesy, good temper and moderation which he considered to be the standards of parliamentary debate. He went on to say that in making his judgement he would consider the nature of members' remarks and the context in which they were made. In 2013, Hay ruled that insinuation of MLAs being members of proscribed organizations was unparliamentary language.

Wales
In the National Assembly for Wales the Presiding Officer has intervened when the term "lying" has been used. In December 2004, the Presiding Officer notably sent Leanne Wood out of the chamber for referring to Queen Elizabeth II as 'Mrs Windsor'.

United States
In the US, representatives were censured for using unparliamentary language in the House of Representatives throughout its history. Other levels of government have similar disciplinary procedures dealing with inappropriate words spoken in the legislature.

Avoiding unparliamentary language
It is a point of pride among some British MPs to be able to insult their opponents in the House without use of unparliamentary language. Several MPs, notably Sir Winston Churchill, have been considered masters of this game.

Some terms which have evaded the Speaker's rules are:

Terminological inexactitude (lie)
Being economical with the truth (lying by omission), since used on the floor of the house as an insult or taunt.
Tired and emotional, a euphemism for intoxicated

Clare Short implicitly accused the Employment minister Alan Clark of being drunk at the dispatch box shortly after her election in 1983, but avoided using the word, saying that Clark was "incapable". Clark's colleagues on the Conservative benches in turn accused Short of using unparliamentary language and the Speaker asked her to withdraw her accusation. Clark later admitted in his diaries that Short had been correct in her assessment. In 1991, Speaker Bernard Weatherill adjudged that usage of the word "jerk" by Opposition leader Neil Kinnock was not unparliamentary language.

Citations

Sources

External links
 Short definition
 CBC News: Political insults: a short history of personal attacks

Westminster system
Euphemisms
English phrases
Parliamentary procedure